is a 1998 fighting video game developed and published by Kodansha based on the 1987 manga of the same name.

Reception
The game was panned by Famitsu, that rated it 12 out of 40 (3/3/4/2) and called it a "kusoge". They criticized the game to be too simple, for not natural action, for the terrible music and graphics, for the long loading times, and they questioned if the game is really finished.

References

1998 video games
Multiplayer video games
PlayStation (console) games
Fighting games
Video games developed in Japan